Erik Robertson (born October 4, 1984) is a former American football center. He was signed by the San Diego Chargers as an undrafted free agent in 2007. He played college football at California.

Robertson was also a member of the Seattle Seahawks, New York Sentinels and Sacramento Mountain Lions.

External links
Cal Bears bio
Seattle Seahawks bio
Just Sports Stats

1984 births
Living people
People from Apple Valley, California
Players of American football from California
American football offensive guards
California Golden Bears football players
San Diego Chargers players
Seattle Seahawks players
Sportspeople from San Bernardino County, California
New York Sentinels players
Sacramento Mountain Lions players
Oklahoma City Yard Dawgz players